Hiawatha Thompson Estes (January 26, 1918 – May 8, 2003) was a California-based architect and author known for designing a large number of variations of the ubiquitous post-war ranch home,  mass marketing plans of them, and publishing a number of books dealing with residential architecture.

Estes was a Chickasaw Indian Nation member. He graduated from the University of Oklahoma and served in World War II as a captain in the Army Air Corps 37th Fighter Squadron.

After the war, Estes founded "Architectural House and Plan Business, Nationwide Plan Book", which was to evolve into Hiawatha Estes and Associates. Estes was a resident of Northridge, California, a neighborhood of Los Angeles, and remarkable for the number and diversity of ranch homes, some of which are Hiawatha Estes designs. Estes was related to Senator Helen TeAta Cole, his cousin, also of Oklahoma.

Published books
 Homes by Hiawatha 1974
 Prize homes 1978, 1981 eds
 Ranch & modern homes 1978

1918 births
2003 deaths
20th-century American architects
20th-century Native Americans
Chickasaw people
University of Oklahoma alumni
United States Army Air Forces personnel of World War II
United States Army Air Forces officers
21st-century Native Americans